Venguessone Nathan (d. after 1424) was a French-Jewish moneylender and merchant.  

She was a member of a prosperous Provençal family. She was active both as a merchant and a moneylender. She sold draperies and dishes of wood, earthenware and glass. In 1424, she was the largest possessor of property in Arles, and owned at least one vineyard. She was learned, and owned books in both Hebrew and Latin. She is known through her famous will, in which both her possessions and wealth as well as her business activities can be traced.

References

 

Year of birth unknown
Year of death unknown
15th-century French Jews
15th-century French women
15th-century French people
15th-century French businesspeople
Medieval bankers
Medieval French merchants
Medieval businesswomen